The Cabinet of Democratic People's Republic of Korea or North Korea (Naegak) is, according to the Constitution of North Korea, the administrative and executive body and a general state-management organ in the Government of North Korea. The Cabinet's principal newspaper is Minju Choson.

History 

In North Korea's first constitution, adopted in 1948, the executive powers were vested in the Cabinet, chaired by Kim Il-sung himself.

The 1972 constitution saw the establishment of the post of President of North Korea which led the executive branch, and the cabinet was split into two organizations: The Central People's Committee(중앙인민위원회) and the State Administration Council(정무원). The Central People's Committee provided the highest visible institutional link between the government and the party and served in effect as a de facto super-cabinet. According to the 1972 constitution, the Central People's Committee exercised various functions and powers such as shaping the internal and external policies of the state, direct the work of the Administration Council and provincial people's committee, supervising the execution of the constitution, laws and ordinances of the Supreme People's Assembly, establish or abolish ministries, executive bodies of the Administration Council and appoint or remove vice premiers, ministers and other members of the Administration Council and also to declare a state of war and enacting mobilization orders in case of emergency. Article 104 gave the authority to the CPC to adopt decrees and decisions and issue directives.

The National Defence Commission was then sub-committee of this body. The CPC's formal powers were all-inclusive and it was chaired by the President. Among its responsibilities are formulating domestic and foreign policies, directing the work of the State Administration Council and its local organs, directing the judiciary, ensuring the enforcement of the constitution and other laws, appointing or removing the vice premiers and cabinet members, establishing or changing administrative subdivisions or their boundaries, and ratifying or abolishing treaties signed with foreign countries. The CPC also may issue decrees, decisions, and instructions. The State Administration Council was guided by the CPC and was led by a premier (chong-ri) and included vice premiers (bochong-ri), ministers (boojang), committee chairmen, and other cabinet-level members of central agencies. It was responsible for the formulation of state economic development plans and measures for implementing them, the preparation of the state budget, and the handling of other monetary and fiscal matters.

1982 saw the People's Armed Forces and Public Security Ministries assigned directly to the President together with the State Inspection Commission.

In 1990, by a CPC decision, the National Defense Commission became fully independent from it as a separate institution, and 1992 constitutional amendments assigned it directly to the Supreme People's Assembly. In 1998 amendments to the Constitution, the Central People's Committee and the State Administration were abolished, and the Cabinet was re-created. Thus, the Cabinet is not only the highest executive enforcement organ but was also expanded to become the general State management organ.

Emphasizing its expanded role, in January 1999 Kim Jong-il stated that

Selection 

The cabinet is appointed and accountable to the Supreme People's Assembly, the North Korean unicameral parliament. The SPA chooses the Premier of North Korea who appoints three vice premiers and the cabinet's ministers. All members of the cabinet are members of the Workers' Party of Korea which rules the country since its establishment in 1948. While the SPA is not in session, the cabinet is accountable to the Presidium of the Supreme People's Assembly.

, some 260 people have served as cabinet ministers. Six of them have been women: Ho Jong-suk (Minister of Culture, Justice), Pak Chong-ae (Agriculture), Yi Yang-suk (Commerce, Textile and Paper Industries), Pak Yong-sin (Culture), Yi Ho-hyok (Foodstuff and Daily Necessities Industries), and Yun Gi-jong (Finance).

Powers and responsibilities 

The Cabinet, as the executive branch of the North Korean state, is responsible for implementing the state's economic policies, as guided by the Workers' Party. The cabinet is not responsible for defense and security issues, as those are handled by the State Affairs Commission. Thus, the security organizations such as the Korean People's Army, Ministry of Social Security and State Security Department report and subordinated directly to the SAC, whose Chairman holds full power as the supreme leader of the republic and the party and overall commander-in-chief of all uniformed forces. The Cabinet convenes a plenary meeting and an executive meeting. The plenary meeting consists of all the Cabinet members, while the executive meeting  is kind of a presidium, and comprises fewer people, including the Premier, vice premier and other Cabinet members whom the Premier nominates. The cabinet forms acts in the form of decisions and directives. In the performance of its mandate the Cabinet is empowered by the Constitution to:
adopt measures to execute state policy.
institute, amend, and supplement regulations concerning state management based on the Constitution and ministerial laws.
guide the work of the Cabinet commissions, ministries, direct ministries and subordinate agencies of the Cabinet and the local people's committees
set up and remove direct ministries and agencies, main administrative economic organizations, and enterprises, and adopt measures to improve the State management structure.
draft the State plan for the development of the national economy and adopt measures to put it into effect.
compile the State budget and adopt measures to implement it.
organize and exercise works in the fields of industry, agriculture, construction, transportation, communications, commerce, trade, land management, city management, education, science, culture, health, physical training, labor administration, environmental protection, tourism and others.
adopt measures to strengthen the monetary and banking system.
do inspection and control work to establish a state management order.
adopt measures to maintain social order, protect State and social cooperation body's possession and interests, and to guarantee citizens’ rights.
conclude treaties with foreign countries, and conduct external activities.
abolish decisions and directions by economic administrative organs, which run counter to the decisions or directions made by its members.

Those Cabinet ministries that oversee economic sectors also control groups of industries called "complexes". These complexes consist of partially or fully state-owned industrial facilities like factories, mines, or farms, depending on the sector. At a local level, the Cabinet supervises the Local People's Committees.

Structure

, the Cabinet consists of the following:

See also 

Politics of North Korea
State Council of South Korea

References

External links 

  

 

ru:Правительство КНДР